Inayat Khan is a Pakistani actor and model. He is known for his roles in De Ijazat Jo Tu, Ishq Zaat, Dil Lagi, GT Road, Resham Gali Ki Husna and Muqaddar Ka Sitara.

Career 
In 2013 he started working as model in commercials and then he won an acting contest after that he started working dramas.

He made his debut as an actor in drama De Ijazat Jo Tu. Then he appeared in several dramas such as Zara Si Bhool, Dil Ek Khilona Tha, Dil Lagi, Farz, Kho Gaya Woh, Baichain Dil, Ishq Zaat and Resham Gali Ki Husna.

He also worked in movies Jackpot, Record and Thori Life, Thori Zindagi.

Personal life 
Inayat married his cousin in 2021 and they have one child.

Filmography

Television

Telefilm

Film

References

External links 
 
 

1990 births
Pakistani male models
Living people
21st-century Pakistani male actors
Male actors in Urdu cinema
Pakistani male television actors